Vernon Methodist Church is a historic Methodist church at the junction of NY 5 and Sconondoa Street in Vernon, Oneida County, New York.  It was built in 1892 and is a rectangular structure consisting of a square sanctuary (54 feet by 54 feet) with projecting, gable roofed wall bays on three sides and an attached parish hall wing.  It features a massive engaged entrance/bell tower which incorporates an open belfry with balustrade and a large bellcast roof with slate shingles.

It was listed on the National Register of Historic Places in 1998.

References

Methodist churches in New York (state)
Churches on the National Register of Historic Places in New York (state)
Queen Anne architecture in New York (state)
Churches completed in 1892
19th-century Methodist church buildings in the United States
Churches in Oneida County, New York
National Register of Historic Places in Oneida County, New York